Estadio Tres de Febrero is a multi-use stadium in José Ingenieros, Buenos Aires, Argentina. It is  the home ground for Club Almagro.  The stadium holds 12,500 people. It was renovated in 2000 after Almagro were promoted to the Primera División Argentina.

References

External links
 Estadio Tres de Febrero

Gallery

Sports venues in Argentina
Almagro
Club Almagro